Route 101 or Highway 101 can refer to multiple roads:

International
 European route E101

Argentina
 National Route 101

Australia
  Southern Ports Highway
  Princes Highway (East)

Brazil
  BR-101

Canada
  British Columbia Highway 101
  Manitoba Highway 101 (Perimeter Highway)
  New Brunswick Route 101
  Newfoundland and Labrador Route 101
  Nova Scotia Highway 101
  Ontario Highway 101
 Prince Edward Island Route 101
  Quebec Route 101

China
   National Highway 101

Costa Rica
 National Route 101

Ireland
 R101 road (North Circular Road, Dublin)

Japan
 Japan National Route 101

Mexico
 Mexican Federal Highway 101

Philippines
 N101 highway (Philippines)

Puerto Rico
 Puerto Rico Highway 101

Russia
 Russian route A130, formerly A101

United Kingdom
, Rotherhithe Tunnel

United States

 U.S. Route 101
	Alabama State Route 101
 Arizona State Route 101
 Arkansas Highway 101
 Colorado State Highway 101
 Connecticut Route 101
 Florida State Road 101
 County Road 101A (Duval County, Florida)
	Georgia State Route 101
 Illinois Route 101
 Indiana State Road 101
 K-101 (Kansas highway)
 Kentucky Route 101
 Louisiana Highway 101
 Maine State Route 101
 Maryland Route 101 (former)
 Massachusetts Route 101
 M-101 (Michigan highway) (former)
 Minnesota State Highway 101
 County Road 101 (Hennepin County, Minnesota)
 County Road 101 (Scott County, Minnesota)
 Missouri Route 101
Missouri Route 101 (1929) (former)
 Nebraska Highway 101 (former)
 New Hampshire Route 101
 New Hampshire Route 101A
 New Hampshire Route 101B (former)
 New Hampshire Route 101C (former)
 New Hampshire Route 101D (former)
 New Hampshire Route 101E
 New Jersey Route 101 (former)
 County Route 101 (Bergen County, New Jersey)
 County Route 101 (Ocean County, New Jersey)
 New Mexico State Road 101
 New York State Route 101
 County Route 101 (Cattaraugus County, New York)
 County Route 101 (Cayuga County, New York)
 County Route 101 (Cortland County, New York)
 County Route 101 (Dutchess County, New York)
 County Route 101 (Fulton County, New York)
 County Route 101 (Nassau County, New York)
 County Route 101 (Orleans County, New York)
 County Route 101 (Seneca County, New York)
 County Route 101 (Suffolk County, New York)
 County Route 101 (Tompkins County, New York)
 County Route 101 (Wayne County, New York)
 North Carolina Highway 101
 Ohio State Route 101
 Oklahoma State Highway 101
 Pennsylvania Route 101 (former)
 Rhode Island Route 101
 South Carolina Highway 101
 South Dakota Highway 101
 Tennessee State Route 101
 Texas State Highway 101
 Texas State Highway Spur 101 (former)
 Farm to Market Road 101
 Utah State Route 101
 Vermont Route 101
 Virginia State Route 101
 West Virginia Route 101
 Wisconsin Highway 101

Territories
 Puerto Rico Highway 101

Uruguay
  Route 101

See also
A101
B101 road
D101 road
P101
R101 road